Svenner is an archipelago in the municipality of Larvik in Vestfold, Norway. It is located outside the mouth of the fjord Larviksfjorden. A lighthouse was established in 1874 on the island Korpekollen. The smaller islands of Bølene, Strømsundholmen and Ferjeholmen were listed as bird sanctuaries in 2009. Geologically, the islands consist largely of syenite. The WWII destroyer HNoMS Svenner (G03) is named after the main island.

References

Archipelagoes of Norway
Landforms of Vestfold og Telemark